Juana Guare or Juana de Guare was a cacique from Daul who fought against indigenous exploitation.

Biography 
She inherited the cacicazgo in the 17th century and by 1690 she owned the vast site known as Junquillal, in Ecuador.

As cacica, she defended the rights of her racial brothers. Her strong protests were raised against the abuses committed by members of the Spanish clergy who exploited, for their benefit and personal enrichment, the indigenous people.

Legacy 
In the province of Los Ríos, a parish was called "Guare" in honor of Juana due to her influence from indigenous chieftaincy.

References 

Indigenous rights activists
17th-century births
Year of death unknown